William Michell (14 February 1796 – 4 November 1872) was a British physician and Member of Parliament.

The son of Bennet Michell, he was born in Bodmin in 1796. He wrote a paper on the use of ergot in childbirth in 1828; that year he was also admitted to Emmanuel College, Cambridge, receiving an MB in 1834, and an MD in 1839. Michell was admitted an MRCS in 1843. He was elected an MP for Bodmin in 1852.

In 1859, faced with a petition against him by James Wyld for corrupt practices during the elections, he agreed not to defend his seat if Wyld would withdraw the petition. Attacked by John Arthur Roebuck, who saw in this an attempt to escape charges, Michell replied that his means were insufficient to sustain the expenses necessary to defend himself against the petition. Roebuck's motion to prevent him from resigning was defeated, and he left Parliament by becoming Steward of the Chiltern Hundreds. He died in Plymouth in 1872.

References

Hansard's Parliamentary Debates, 5 August 1859. "Election Compromises—Bodmin Election".

1796 births
1872 deaths
Alumni of Emmanuel College, Cambridge
Members of the Parliament of the United Kingdom for Bodmin
UK MPs 1852–1857
UK MPs 1857–1859
People from Bodmin